The 1919 Denver Pioneers football team was an American football team that represented the University of Denver as a member of the Rocky Mountain Conference (RMC) during the 1919 college football season. In their first and only season under head coach George Koonsman, the Pioneers compiled a 1–5–1 record (0–4–1 against conference opponents), tied for seventh place in the RMC, and were outscored by a total of 191 to 23.

Schedule

References

Denver
Denver Pioneers football seasons
Denver Pioneers football